Jeffrey N. Roy is a State Representative in the Commonwealth of Massachusetts, Massachusetts General Court. Roy represents the 10th Norfolk District, which includes the Town of Franklin, Massachusetts in its entirety and Precincts 2, 3 and 4 of the Town of Medway, Massachusetts. Roy was elected on the 6th of November, 2012.

Education
Roy is a 1986 cum laude graduate of Boston College Law School in Chestnut Hill, Massachusetts. He received his undergraduate degree from Bates College in Lewiston, Maine in 1983, where he served as Editor-in-Chief of the Bates Student newspaper. In addition, Jeff received engineering training at Worcester Polytechnic Institute from 1979 to 1981 and one year of legal training at DePaul University in Chicago, Illinois. Jeff participated in a judicial clerkship in 1985-86 with Francis J. Larkin on the Appellate Division of the District Court, Western Division.

Career
Roy is employed at Roy Law in Franklin, Massachusetts, a law firm he started in 2013 to be closer to his district. His entire legal career has been primarily devoted to the representation of injured persons. He specializes in product liability cases, automobile accidents, construction accidents, and other work-related injuries. Roy has represented clients at all levels of the trial and appellate courts in Massachusetts. In addition, he has appeared in cases before the New Hampshire Supreme Court and Superior Court, the Federal District Courts of Massachusetts and New Hampshire, the Rhode Island Superior Court, Colorado Superior Court, and the United States Court of Appeals for the First Circuit.

Roy is a member of the American Association for Justice (AAJ) and the Massachusetts Bar Association.

Public service
Before his run for State office, Roy held a number of municipal positions in the town of Franklin. In 2011, he was elected to the Town Council and was later selected to chair the town’s Master Plan Committee.

Prior to Town Council, he served on the School Committee in Franklin, and served as its chairman for 9 of his 10 years of service with that board.

In 2010, he was elected as the chairman of the Franklin Democratic Town Committee, co-chaired Franklin’s Anti-Bullying Task Force, served as a member of Franklin’s Horace Mann School Building Committee, and was the chairman of the board of directors for the non-profit Masque Theatre Co., Inc. in Milford, Massachusetts. Other memberships include the College Club and Alumni-in-Admissions for Bates College.

Personal life
Roy has been married to his wife Maureen for 31 years and is the father of three children, all educated in the Franklin school system.

Roy is an avid cyclist and an 17-year veteran rider in the annual Pan-Massachusetts Challenge event which raises money for the Jimmy Fund. He has been riding as a member of the Phil Phriends team since 2003. He is also a guitar player and member of the band Ben Gardner’s Boat.

His honors and awards include the St. Thomas More Society of Worcester Scholarship and the American Jurisprudence Award for Constitutional Law.

See also
 2019–2020 Massachusetts legislature
 2021–2022 Massachusetts legislature

References

External links
Jeff Roy's Website
State House Website
Law Firm Bio
PanMass Challenge

Living people
Democratic Party members of the Massachusetts House of Representatives
People from Franklin, Massachusetts
1961 births
21st-century American politicians